The 2018 Wyoming Senate election was held on Tuesday, November 6, 2018, with the primary election held on August 21, 2018. Voters in the 15 odd-numbered districts of the Wyoming State Senate elected their representatives. The elections coincided with the elections for other offices, including U.S. Senate, U.S. House, Governor, and the State House

Primary Election

Overview

Results

District 1

District 3

District 5

District 7

District 9

District 11

District 13

District 15

District 17

District 19

District 21

District 23

District 25

District 27

District 29

General Election

Overview

Results

District 1
Republican Incumbent Ogden Driskill was re-elected with no challenger.

District 3
Republican Cheri Steinmetz was elected with 80% of the vote compared to Democrat Marci Shaver who received 20% of the vote.

District 5
Republican Lynn Hutchings won the election with no challengers.

District 7
Republican Incumbent Stephan Pappas won the election with no challengers.

District 9
Democratic Incumbent Chris Rothfuss won the election with no challengers.

District 11
Republican Incumbent Larry S. Hicks was re-elected with 66% of the vote compared to Democrat Lee Ann
Stephenson who received 34% of the vote.

District 13
Republican Tom James defeated Incumbent Democrat John Hastert with 47% of the vote to Hastert's 37%, Independent candidate Ted L. Barney won 16% of the vote.

District 15
Republican Wendy Davis Schuler won the election with no challengers.

District 17
Democratic Candidate Mike Gierau won the election with 62% of the vote against Republican Kate Mead who won 38% of the vote.

District 19

Republican R J Kost won the election with no challengers.

District 21
Republican Bo Biteman was elected with 64% of the vote compared to Democrat Hollis Hackman who received 35% of the vote.

District 23
Republican Incumbent Jeff Wasserburger won the election with no challengers.

District 25
Republican Incumbent Cale Case was elected with % of the vote compared to Democrat Sergio A. Maldonado, Sr. who received % of the vote.

District 27
Republican Incumbent Bill Landen won the election with no challengers.

District 29
Republican Incumbent Drew Perkins won the election with no challengers.

References

Senate
Wyoming State Senate elections
Wyoming State Senate